Robert "Bob" Sherman (November 16, 1940 in Redwood City, California – August 30, 2004 in London) was an American-born dramaturge, playwright and film and television actor, best remembered for his role as CIA agent Jeff Ross in the British television series The Sandbaggers.

Select films

Children Shouldn't Play with Dead Things (1972) - Ghoul
The Cherry Picker (1974) - James Burn III
The Great Gatsby (1974) - Detective at Pool
Feelings (1975) - Michael
The Ritz (1976) - Patron (scenes deleted)
The Pink Panther Strikes Again (1976) - C.I.A. Agent
The Spy Who Loved Me (1977) - Executive Officer (USS Wayne Crewman)
First Monday in October (1981) - Senator #2
Ragtime (1981) - Policeman No. 10
Who Dares Wins (1982) - Hagen
Krypskyttere (1982) - Streufert, major
Sheena (1984) - Grizzard
Haunters of the Deep (1984) - Mr. Roche
Little Shop of Horrors (1986) - Agent
Superman IV: The Quest for Peace (1987) - Pentagon Senator
Dark Tower (1989) - Williams (as Robert Sherman)
Kidô keisatsu patorebâ (1989-1993) - Cop / Rock / Tsuge (1995) / Cab / Jones / Rooster (1996) (English version, voice, uncredited)
Company Business (1991) - Sobel
Lancelot: Guardian of Time (1997) - Additional Gargoyle
Lost Souls (1998) - George Giffard
RPM (1998) - Karl Delson
Spy Games (1999) - CIA Elder
Starry Night (1999) - Lyle
Hellboy (2004) - Television Host
The Life and Death of Peter Sellers (2004) - Movie Executive

Select television

Big Town (1 episode, 1953) (TV)
Not for Hire (1 episode, 1960) (TV) - Bobo
W. Somerset Maugham (1 episode, 1969) (TV) - Bateman Hunter
UFO  (1 episode, 1970) (TV) - Launch Control 1st Operative (uncredited)
Jackanory (5 episodes, 1971) (TV) - Storyteller
The Persuaders! (1 episode, 1971) (TV) - The Lieutenant
Applause (1973) (TV) - Bert
Zodiac (1 episode, 1974) (TV) - Bob Thomas
Father Brown (1 episode, 1974) (TV) - Patrick Floyd
Space: 1999 (1 episode, 1975) (TV) - Newscaster
Quiller (1 episode, 1975) (TV) - Perry
Jubilee (1 episode, 1977) (TV) - Lester
Wings (1 episode, 1978) (TV) - Leroy Schultz
A Life at Stake (1 episode, 1978) (TV) - Jack Swigert
Holocaust (1 episode, 1978) (TV) - Cassidy
Return of the Saint (1 episode, 1978) (TV) - Jimmy
The Sandbaggers (17 episodes, 1978–1980) (TV) - Jeff Ross
Oppenheimer (4 episodes, 1980) (TV) - Ernest Lawrence
Three's Company (1 episode, 1981) (TV) - Katy's brother
Whoops Apocalypse (1 episode, 1982) (TV) - Buzz
Remington Steele (1 episode, 1984) (TV) - Ron
C.A.T.S. Eyes (1 episode, 1985) (TV) - Vic
Murrow (1986) (TV) - Don Hewitt
Big Deal (1 episode, 1986) (TV) - Hal Brookman
Strong Medicine (1986) (TV) - Senator Donahue
Freedom Fighter (1988) (TV) - Captain Winter
Monkey (1989) (TV) - John Vicenza / Valestra
Countdown to War (1989) (TV) - Bullitt
Cyber City Oedo 808 (1990) (TV) - Juzo Hasegawa (English version, voice)
Look at It This Way (1992) (TV mini-series) - Arnie Zwitters
Space Precinct (1 episode, 1994) (TV) - Alden Humes
Scarlett (1994) (TV mini-series) - Dr. Jonathan Fixe
MacGyver: Trail to Doomsday (1994) (TV) - Anthony Graves
Human Bomb (1998) (TV) - Bob
Big Bad World (1 episode, 1999) (TV) - Kurt
CI5: The New Professionals (1 episode, 1999) (TV) - General Ross
Doomwatch: Winter Angel (1999) (TV) - Bill Zeiss
The American Embassy (1 episode, 2002) (TV) - Jackson
The Falklands Play (2002) (TV) - President Ronald Reagan
Judge John Deed (1 episode, 2003) (TV) - Frank Daniels

Select video games

Heart of Darkness (1998) (VG) - Friends

References

External links

1940 births
2004 deaths
American male television actors
American male voice actors
American male film actors
Male actors from the San Francisco Bay Area
People from Redwood City, California
20th-century American dramatists and playwrights
Dramaturges
20th-century American male actors